Billacombe railway station served the village of Billacombe, Devon, England from 1898 on 1960 on the Plymouth to Yealmpton Branch.

History 
The station opened on 17 January 1898 by the Great Western Railway. The station closed to passengers on 7 July 1930. Like the other stations on the branch, it reopened  for those who were forced to leave their homes due to the World War II blitz, except this station reopened on 3 November 1941. It closed again to passengers on 6 October 1947 and to goods traffic on 29 February 1960.

References

External links 

Disused railway stations in Devon
Former Great Western Railway stations
Railway stations in Great Britain opened in 1898
Railway stations in Great Britain closed in 1930
Railway stations in Great Britain opened in 1941
Railway stations in Great Britain closed in 1947
1898 establishments in England
1960 disestablishments in England